The Directorate General of Budget, Accounting and Statistics (DGBAS) is a branch of the Executive Yuan of the Republic of China (Taiwan), performs the role of both a comptroller for the government and census bureau.

History
The DGBAS was established in April 1931 under the Nationalist Government. In May 1948, DGBAS was elevated to the Ministry of Budget, Accounting and Statistics and was placed under the Executive Yuan. In November 1973, the Organization Act of DGBAS was revised and came into force. It was again revised in May 1983. In line with Executive Yuan restructuring policy, DBGAS was reorganized in February 2012. The functions of its departments were reviewed and the Electronic Data Processing Center was merged into DGBAS.

Organizational structure
 The Board of Comptrollers
 Department of Planning
 Department of General Fund Budget
 Department of Special Fund Budget
 Department of Accounting and Financial Reporting
 Department of Statistics
 Department of Census
 Department of Information Management
 Secretariat
 Department of Personnel
 Civil Service Ethics Office
 BAS Office
 BAS Training Center
 Laws and Regulations Committee
 National Income Statistics Review Committee

List of leaders

 (April 1931 – October 1946)
 (October 1946 – November 1948)
Pang Songzhou (龐松舟) (November 1948 – December 1949)
Wang Yao (王燿) (December 1949 – March 1950)
Chen Liang (陳良) (March 1950 – August 1950)
Pang Songzhou (龐松舟) (August 1950 – July 1958)
Chen Ching-yu (陳慶瑜) (July 1958 – March 1963)
Chang Daoming (張導民) (March 1963 – January 1969)
 (January 1969 – June 1978)
Ching Shih-yi (鍾時益) (June 1978 – 11 January 1987)
Yu Chien-ming (于建民) (12 January 1987 – 26 February 1993)
Wang Kun (汪錕) (27 February 1993 – 9 June 1996)
 (10 June 1996 – 19 May 2000)
Lin Chuan (20 May 2000 – 1 December 2002) 
Liu San-chi (劉三錡) (2 December 2002 – 19 May 2004)
Hsu Jan-yau (20 May 2004 – 19 May 2008)
Shih Su-mei (20 May 2008 – 19 May 2016)
Chu Tzer-ming (20 May 2016 –)

Transportation
The building is accessible within walking distance South from Xiaonanmen Station of the Taipei Metro.

See also
 Executive Yuan

References

External links 

1931 establishments in China
Government agencies established in 1931
Executive Yuan
Government of Taiwan
Statistical organizations